Ramsaytown is an unincorporated community in Jefferson County, in the U.S. state of Pennsylvania.

History
Ramsaytown was originally a mining community. A post office called Ramsaytown was established in 1906, and remained in operation until 1934.

References

Unincorporated communities in Jefferson County, Pennsylvania
Unincorporated communities in Pennsylvania